ConneXions: A Community Based Arts School (formerly known as the ConneXions Community Leadership Academy) is a public secondary school located in Baltimore, Maryland, United States.

References

External links
 
 ConneXions School for the Arts - Maryland Report Card

Public schools in Baltimore
Public middle schools in Maryland
Public high schools in Maryland
Charter schools in Maryland